The 7.92×36mm EPK was an experimental rifle round intended for the Pyrkal light machine gun. The round is essentially a 6.5mm Mannlicher cartridge case shortened to 36mm and necked up to chamber a 7.92 mm bullet.

References
Christos Sazanidis, "Ta opla ton Ellinon (Arms of the Greeks)", Maiandros, Thessaloniki (1995)
W. Smith - J. Smith, "Small Arms of the World", 10th rev.ed., Stackpole, Harrisburg (1973)

External links
Pyrkal article at Hellenica website via Wayback Machine archive
Anthony G Williams, "Assault Rifles and Their Ammunition: History and Prospects"

Pistol and rifle cartridges
Military equipment of Greece
Military cartridges